John Vaughn (born 1984) is an American former football placekicker.

John Vaughn is also the name of:

Jon Vaughn (born 1970), American former football running back
John Vaughn (Franciscan) (1928–2016)
John C. Vaughn (1824–1875), American officer for the Confederate Army
Jack Vaughn (1920–2012), director of the New Brunswick Peace Corps
Jack Vaughn Jr. (born 1974), American record and television producer

See also
John Vaughan (disambiguation)